Děpolt or Děpold is the Czech language variant of the German name Diepold, a variant of Theobald. Notable people with this name include:
 (1123-1247), a Cadet branch of Přemyslid dynasty
Děpold I of Jamnitz
Děpolt II, also known as Diepold II

Czech given names
Germanic given names